China Datang Corporation (CDT) is one of the five large-scale power generation enterprises in China, established on the basis of former State Power Corporation of China in 2002. It is a solely state-owned enterprise directly managed by the SASAC and is the experimental state-authorized investment and state shareholding enterprise ratified by the State Council.

Subsidiaries
 Datang International Power Generation Company (大唐国际发电股份) is a core subsidiary company with approximately one third of the Group's thermal installed capacity.
 Datang Renewable Power Company was listed on the Hong Kong Stock exchange in December 2010.

See also

 China Southern Power Grid
China State Grid Corporation

References

External links
China Datang Corporation

Companies based in Beijing
Government-owned companies of China
Electric power companies of China
Chinese companies established in 2002
Energy companies established in 2002